The Theban Tomb TT24 is located in Sheikh Abd el-Qurna. It forms part of the Theban Necropolis, situated on the west bank of the Nile opposite Luxor. The tomb is the burial place of the ancient Egyptian official, Nebamun.

Nebamun was the steward of the king's wife Nebtu, one of the wives of Thutmose III. Nebamun was the son of Tetires and Lady Ipu. His wife was named Resti.

See also
 List of Theban tombs
 N. de Garis Davies, Nina and Norman de Garis Davies, Egyptologists

References

External links
Scans of Norman and Nina De Garis Davies' tracings of Theban Tomb 24 (external).

Buildings and structures completed in the 15th century BC
Theban tombs